The 2023 Women's Basketball Invitational (WBI) is a double-elimination tournament consisting of eight NCAA Division I teams not selected to participate in the 2023 NCAA Division I women's basketball tournament or 2023 Women's National Invitation Tournament. The 2023 field was announced on March 13. The 2023 edition of the tournament was played on the campus of Transylvania University in Lexington, Kentucky at the Clive M. Beck Center. This was the third year in a row the tournament consisted of an eight-team field played over four days, with a guarantee of three games for all teams. There was no winning percentage requirement to compete in the tournament. Cal Baptist won the tournament in their first-ever appearance.

Participating teams
The following teams accepted invitations to compete in the 2023 Women's Basketball Invitational:

Schedule

^ - Consolation Bracket

Bracket

See also 
2023 NCAA Division I women's basketball tournament
2023 Women's National Invitation Tournament

References

Women's Basketball Invitational
Women's basketball competitions
Women's basketball
Women's basketball competitions in the United States
WBI